The Mosaic of Transformation is the eighth studio album by American singer-songwriter Kaitlyn Aurelia Smith. It was released on May 15, 2020 under Ghostly International.

Critical reception
The Mosaic of Transformation was met with generally favorable reviews from critics. At Metacritic, which assigns a weighted average rating out of 100 to reviews from mainstream publications, this release received an average score of 76, based on 8 reviews.

Track listing

References

2020 albums
Kaitlyn Aurelia Smith albums